Purgatory Chasm State Reservation is a protected state park in Sutton, Massachusetts. Located within Blackstone Valley, the reservation is managed by the Massachusetts Department of Conservation and Recreation.

History
Previously owned by the Whitin Machine Works, Purgatory Chasm was declared a state park in 1919. The reservation is notable for its ,  chasm of granite bedrock with abrupt precipices and caves. Various theories have been proposed to account for the creation of the chasm. According to one source, it was created when glacial meltwater ripped out bedrock at the end of the last Ice Age.

Purgatory Chasm is open to the public, although the chasm is closed to hikers during the winter season because of icy hazards. The reservation also includes picnic areas, a visitor center, and a playground.

In popular culture
A 1992 episode of Rescue 911 concerned events at Purgatory Chasm.
Scenes from the 2015 film The Sea of Trees were filmed at Purgatory Chasm.

Gallery

References

External links
Official website

Protected areas established in 1919
State parks of Massachusetts
Landforms of Worcester County, Massachusetts
Rock formations of Massachusetts
Parks in Worcester County, Massachusetts
Sutton, Massachusetts